Raja Krishna Menon is an Indian film writer, director and producer. He started as an advertisement director and later moved to feature films. He has directed three Bollywood films. His most recent film Chef was released on 7 October 2017.

Early life and background
Menon was born in Thrissur, Kerala and brought up in Bangalore. He is the son of Malayalam actor T. P. Madhavan. He spent a major part of his childhood in Kerala. He studied at The Valley School and finished a Bachelors in Science (BSc) degree with a Chemistry Major from Christ College, Bangalore. Although a science student, Menon was involved in creative pursuits throughout college. He was a debater, quizzer, and writer and won many college festival competitions.

Career
On receiving his degree, Menon assisted D. Radhakrishnan, an ad film director and still photographer. He moved to Mumbai in 1993 and by 1996, was managing the business for writer/director Sanjeev Khamgaonkar. Towards the end of 1996, Menon went independent, working out of an office that director Mukul Anand gave him. He started editing commercials and got into the business of creating trailers for Bollywood films, shooting and creating trailers that were not just an edit of the film footage. His early films included Raja Hindustani, Army and Loafer. Menon then moved on to advertisement commercials and has made over 300 commercials till date

In 2003, Menon wrote, directed and produced his first feature film titled Bas Yun Hi starring Purab Kohli and Nandita Das. He continued with advertising from 2003 – 2008. In 2009 he wrote, produced and directed his second feature film Barah Aana starring Naseeruddin Shah, Vijay Raaz, and Italian actress Violante Placido. The film was a critical success. Barah Aana was selected in international film festivals, including the Chicago International Film Festival.

Post films he continued to produce commercials and documentaries for Oglivy, JWT, Creative Land Asia, BBH, Ulka etc. in partnership with Janani Ravichandran under their banner ‘Bandra West Pictures’.

Menon's third film Airlift was released on 22 January, 2016 starring Akshay Kumar and Nimrit Kaur in the lead. The film received critical acclaim and box office success.

He is committed to direct Shahid Kapoor in the yet untitled Dingko SIngh's Biopic.

Filmography

References

External links
 
 Raja Krishna Menon on ‘Airlift’, Akshay Kumar and the biggest human evacuation in history

Malayalam film directors
Film directors from Thrissur
Film directors from Bangalore
Living people
Film producers from Bangalore
Screenwriters from Bangalore
Year of birth missing (living people)
Christ University alumni